is a train station in Higashi-ku, Niigata, Niigata Prefecture, Japan, operated by East Japan Railway Company (JR East).

Lines
Ōgata Station is served by the Hakushin Line, and is 7.0 kilometers from the starting point of the line at Niigata Station.

Station layout
The station consists of two ground-level opposed side platforms connected by a footbridge, serving two tracks. The station is staffed.

Platforms

History
The station opened on 11 February 1957. With the privatization of Japanese National Railways (JNR) on 1 April 1987, the station came under the control of JR East.

Passenger statistics
In fiscal 2018, the station was used by an average of 1168 passengers daily (boarding passengers only). This was a 4.18% reduction compared to the fiscal 2017 count of 1219 passengers daily.

Surrounding area
 University of Niigata Prefecture
 Niigata Kita High School

See also
 List of railway stations in Japan

References

External links

 JR East station information 

Railway stations in Niigata (city)
Hakushin Line
Railway stations in Japan opened in 1957
Stations of East Japan Railway Company